Conic Hill (from Gaelic "còinneach" meaning moss) is a prominent hill in Stirling, Scotland.

Location and description 

It is on the east bank of Loch Lomond, beside the village of Balmaha. It is a sharp little summit which is on the Highland Boundary Fault. There was a tiny cairn at the top;  there is only a scattering of stones to mark the "true" summit.

Views 
In addition, the rounded outline of Ailsa Craig in the Clyde Estuary is sometimes visible.

Ascent 
It is accessible for walking, and forms part of the West Highland Way. During the lambing season, dogs are not allowed in the two enclosed fields on the east approach to Conic Hill, even if they are on a lead. The season normally lasts for around three weeks at the end of April and early May. However, this does not affect access with a dog to Conic Hill from the Balmaha direction.

The hill is accessible by public transport, with buses and ferries arriving in Balmaha. There is also a car park at the base, allowing those with vehicles a place to park before climbing the hill.

In August 2013, 8 members of Deafblind Scotland ascended the hill with help from rangers and guides.

External links
Walk Highlands Report
West Highland Way Route over Conic Hill

References

Marilyns of Scotland
Geography of Stirling (council area)